Seymour Samuel Cook (November 3, 1832 – May 10, 1919) was an American politician in the state of Washington. He served in the Washington House of Representatives from 1889 to 1891.

References

Republican Party members of the Washington House of Representatives
1919 deaths
1832 births
19th-century American politicians